José Hmaé (born March 5, 1978) is a football striker from New Caledonia. He currently plays for AS Pirae.

He scored a winning goal in the game versus Fiji national football team in the final of the 2007 South Pacific Games.

External links

References
  
 others articles of English Wikipedia

1978 births
Living people
New Caledonian footballers
New Caledonia international footballers
A.S. Pirae players

Association football forwards